The following highways are numbered 35A:

Canada 
 Ontario Highway 35A

United States
 County Road 35A (Pasco County, Florida)
 Nebraska Recreation Road 35A
 New York State Route 35A (former)
 County Route 35A (Rockland County, New York)
 County Route 35A (Suffolk County, New York)